The Chuckanut Mountains (from "Chuckanut", an Indian word meaning "long beach far from a narrow entrance"), or Chuckanuts, are located on the northern Washington state coast of the Salish Sea, just south of Bellingham, Washington. Being a part of the Cascade Range, they are the only place where the Cascades come west down to meet the sea. The Chuckanuts are considered to be a part of the Puget Lowland Forest Ecoregion.

The range contains Larrabee State Park, the first State Park to be designated in Washington (1923). Its mountains include:

Anderson Mountain
Blanchard Mountain
Chuckanut Mountain (including North Chuckanut Mountain, South Chuckanut Mountain, and Chuckanut Ridge)
Galbraith Mountain (also known as North Lookout Mountain)
King Mountain
Lookout Mountain
Sehome Hill
Squalicum Mountain
Stewart Mountain
Toad Mountain

Geology
The Chuckanut Mountains were formed by the folding of the Chuckanut Formation (which is predominantly made up of layers of 55-million-year-old sandstone, conglomerate, shale, and bituminous and sub-bituminous coal) and the later Huntingdon Formation (predominantly shale and sandstone) on top, as well as an exposed section of pre-Jurassic-age phyllite. The Chuckanuts are well known for their Tertiary Period leaf fossils.

In 1988, an outcrop of metamorphic phyllite, green chert, and milk quartz on Blanchard Mountain was exposed by a construction crew. The outcrop is unique for its unusually large chunks of stilpnomelane.

References

External links
 

Mountain ranges of Washington (state)
North Cascades of Washington (state)
Landforms of Whatcom County, Washington
Washington placenames of Native American origin